The Notitia Galliarum (or Notitia provinciarum et civitatum Galliae) is a Roman register of cities dating to the 4th–6th centuries AD. The Latin register is divided into two headings. Ten provinces are listed under the diocese of Gaul and seven under the diocese of the Seven Provinces. For each province the capital city is given and then its other cities (civitates). They are given their ethnic names, i.e., "city of [people]". A total of 115 cities are listed along with six or seven castra (forts) and one portus (harbour).

The original list was probably drawn up during the reign of Magnus Maximus (383–388). Its rubric states that it was made on the order of the bishops, but this was probably added later when the list was updated. The civitates of the Notitia parallel the dioceses of the Roman church, bur for the 6th rather than the 4th century. It was probably at that time that the castra and portus, which had acquired bishops, were added, along with the rubric. The bishops' purpose was to prevent disputes over metropolitan authority, "lest antiquity be overturned by any eventuality".

The Notitia remained an important reference point throughout the Middle Ages and is preserved in over 100 manuscripts, but often interpolated.

Cities listed

Lugdunensis Prima
Lyon
Autun
Langres
Chalon-sur-Saone
Mâcon
Lugdunensis Secunda
Rouen
Bayeux
Avranches
Évreux
Sées
Lisieux
Coutances
Lugdunensis Tertia
Tours
Le Mans
Rennes
Angers
Nantes
Corseul
Vannes
Carhaix
Jublains
Lugdunensis Senonia
Sens
Chartres
Auxerre
Troyes
Orléans
Paris
Meaux
Belgica Prima
Trier
Metz
Toul
Verdun
Belgica Secunda
Reims
Soissons
Châlons
Vermand
Arras
Cambrai
Tournai
Senlis
Beauvais
Amiens
Thérouanne
Boulogne
Germania Prima
Mainz
Strasbourg
Speyer
Worms
Germania Secunda
Cologne
Tongeren
Maxima Sequanorum
Besançon
Nyon
Avenches
Basel
Windisch
Yverdon
Horbourg-Wihr
Augst
Port-sur-Saône
Alpes Graiae et Poeninae
Moûtiers
Martigny
Septem Provinciae
Vienne
Geneva
Grenoble
Alba-la-Romaine
Die
Valence
Saint-Paul-Trois-Châteaux
Vaison
Orange
Cavaillon
Avignon
Arles
Marseille
Carpentras
Aquitanica Prima
Bourges
Clermont-Ferrand
Rodez
Albi
Cahors
Limoges
Javols
Saint-Paulien
Aquitanica Secunda
Bordeaux
Agen
Angoulême
Saintes
Poitiers
Périgueux
Novempopulana
Eauze
Auch
Dax
Lectoure
Saint-Bertrand-de-Comminges
Saint-Lizier
La Teste-de-Buch
Pau
Aire-sur-l'Adour
Bazas
Tarbes
Oloron
Narbonensis Prima
Narbonne
Toulouse
Béziers
Nîmes
Lodève
Uzès
Agde
Maguelonne
Narbonensis Secunda
Aix-en-Provence
Apt
Riez
Fréjus
Gap
Sisteron
Antibes
Alpes Maritimae
Embrun
Digne
Barcelonette
Castellane
Senez
Glandèves
Cimiez
Vence

See also
Laterculus Veronensis, a list of Roman provinces from earlier in the 4th century
Notitia Dignitatum, a list of Roman offices from about 400

Notes

Bibliography

Government of the Roman Empire
Western Roman Empire
4th century in Roman Gaul